Darreh Rud (also Romanized as Darreh Rūd) is a village in Sarduiyeh Rural District, Sarduiyeh District, Jiroft County, Kerman Province, Iran. At the 2006 census, its population was 790, in 152 families.

References 

Populated places in Jiroft County